USS Partridge (AM-16) was an  acquired by the United States Navy for the dangerous task of removing mines from minefields laid in the water to prevent ships from passing.

Partridge was named after the partridge, any of various gallinaceous birds, such as the ruffed grouse or bob-white quail, found in North America.
 
Partridge was laid down on 14 May 1918 by the Chester Shipbuilding Co., Chester, Pennsylvania: launched on 15 October 1918; sponsored by Ms. C. H. McCay; and commissioned on 17 June 1919.

Post-World War I operations
Completed too late to participate in World War I, Partridge operated in the Pacific Ocean until returning to the Atlantic Ocean in June 1941. Converted to an ocean-going tug, Partridge was reclassified AT-138 on 1 June 1942. The tug participated in rescue and towing duties along the eastern seaboard and in the Caribbean, making an important contribution to saving lives and ships, until early May 1944.

World War II operations
Reclassified ATO-138 on 15 May 1944, Partridge was ordered to England to assist in preparing for the coming invasion of Normandy. The ship remained in England until 10 June, when she was ordered to sail for the beachhead.

Partridge was struck from the Naval Vessel Register on 29 July 1944.

References

External links

USS Partridge.com
USS Partridge (AM 16)
uboat.net – Lapwing class minesweepers

Lapwing-class minesweepers
Ships built in Chester, Pennsylvania
1918 ships
World War II auxiliary ships of the United States
World War II shipwrecks in the English Channel
Lapwing-class minesweepers converted to tugs
Maritime incidents in June 1944